South Dakota Highway 87 (SD 87) is a  state highway in the southwestern part of the U.S. state of South Dakota. It travels through the Black Hills region.

The highway travels through Wind Cave National Park. The northern  of the highway is also known as the Needles Highway. The Needles Highway, along with the concurrency with US 16A, are also part of the Peter Norbeck Scenic Byway. Portions of the highway are also a section of Custer State Park's Wildlife Loop.

Route description
Because of the highway's mountainous, curving nature, it is closed during the winter.

South of US 16A
Highway 87 begins at US 385 in Wind Cave National Park, east of Pringle and west of the park headquarters. North of US 385, the route crosses Cold Spring Creek and provides access to the upstream Lake Norbeck, named after Senator Peter Norbeck, instrumental in establishing several of the national and state parks in the Black Hills. This results in the route taking a westerly track, though it eventually turns back north and crosses Beaver Creek.  into the route, it bridges itself and executes a 270° turn.

Highway 87 then becomes part of the park's Wildlife Loop, and runs through the town of Blue Bell.

At milepost 17.180 (27.649 km), Highway 87 intersects U.S. Route 16A. From this point onward, the road is part of the Peter Norbeck Scenic Byway. The two routes form a concurrency and proceed east, passing Legion Lake. The roads split after just under .

Needles Highway

After splitting from US 16A, the route is known as the Needles Highway. Finished in 1922, the highway is named after the high granite "needles" it winds among. Access to the portion of the Needles Highway between the intersection with SD 89 and the intersection with US-16A east requires a Custer State Park entrance license, making that portion of SD 87 a toll road. Along this stretch lies the Black Hills Playhouse. The highway passes through two tunnels blasted through sheer granite walls — Iron Creek Tunnel and Needles Eye Tunnel. That part of the road is almost exclusively used by sightseers.

Just after Needles Eye Tunnel, Highway 87 serves as the northern terminus of SD 89. After this junction, SD 87 has one more tunnel, Hood Tunnel. It then provides access to the Sylvan Lake Resort. The route finally ends at US 16/385 south of Hill City.

Major intersections

See also
 The Needles

References

External links 

SD-87 at AARoads.com

087
Black Hills
Transportation in Custer County, South Dakota
Transportation in Pennington County, South Dakota